Laverne is a town in Harper County, Oklahoma, United States. The population was 1,223 at the 2020 census.

History
Laverne's origin is traced to John Mollman's homestead, which he established in 1903. The site was then in Woodward County, Oklahoma Territory. A post office was established in 1896 with the name Laverne and continued operating until 1908. After 1908, mail addressed to Laverne was redirected to another post office named Speedmore (now defunct).

Mollman sold part of his acreage to a townsite promoter in 1911. The promoter platted the area and began selling lots. The Wichita Falls and Northwestern Railway (WF&NW), a Missouri, Kansas and Texas Railway (Katy) subsidiary, reached the new settlement in spring, 1912.

The community was named Laverne after the old post office was moved to the new site in May, 1912. According to the Encyclopedia of Oklahoma History and Culture, by June, 1912, Laverne had 44 businesses, including the Laverne State Bank, the Fox Hotel (NR 78002236) and the Clover Hotel (NR 84003034). Both hotels were built in 1912.

Geography
Laverne is located at  (36.708137, -99.897106).

Lake Evans Chambers is to the west.

Demographics

As of the census of 2000, there were 1,097 people, 503 households, and 303 families residing in the town. There were 637 housing units at an average density of 855.5 per square mile (332.4/km2). The racial makeup of the town was 97.08% White, 0.73% Native American, 0.09% Asian, 1.37% from other races, and 0.73% from two or more races. Hispanic or Latino of any race were 3.65% of the population.

There were 503 households, out of which 26.4% had children under the age of 18 living with them, 50.9% were married couples living together, 7.0% had a female householder with no husband present, and 39.6% were non-families. 38.0% of all households were made up of individuals, and 21.7% had someone living alone who was 65 years of age or older. The average household size was 2.18 and the average family size was 2.89.

In the town, the population was spread out, with 23.6% under the age of 18, 7.2% from 18 to 24, 24.4% from 25 to 44, 21.1% from 45 to 64, and 23.6% who were 65 years of age or older. The median age was 41 years. For every 100 females, there were 88.5 males. For every 100 females age 18 and over, there were 83.8 males.

The median income for a household in the town was $32,222, and the median income for a family was $38,984. Males had a median income of $31,667 versus $20,000 for females. The per capita income for the town was $20,424. About 8.9% of families and 13.0% of the population were below the poverty line, including 26.9% of those under age 18 and 3.5% of those age 65 or over.

Economy
The Laverne economy has been supported largely on agriculture, with broomcorn, wheat and cattle as the leading products until 1920. Hay replaced broomcorn, whose market has largely disappeared. Oil and gas production became important during the 1920s. Laverne acquired the nickname, "the Oil Capital of Northwest Oklahoma" during a short-lived boom in production during the 1950s. The Katy stopped rail service in 1972 and abandoned its line to Laverne.

The local newspaper, Laverne Leader Tribune, is published weekly.

Education
The Laverne public school system educates students from Harper and Ellis counties, as well as those from Beaver County.

Historic sites

The following in the Laverne area are NRHP-listed:
 Beagley-Stinson Archeological Site
 Clover Hotel
 Fox Hotel
 Laverne's North Main Street District
 M. K. and T. Depot in Laverne
 Sharp Lumberyard

Notable people
Jane Jayroe, Miss America 1967, former news anchor at KOCO (Oklahoma City) and KXAS (Dallas), moved to Laverne with her family from Sentinel during her childhood. A major street in Laverne was renamed for her.
Jimmy Webb, songwriter and musician, moved to Laverne and attended Laverne Public Schools for his junior year. After Laverne, he moved to California to start his career. According to numerous articles about Jimmy Webb he claims Laverne as his hometown in Oklahoma.

References

Towns in Harper County, Oklahoma
Towns in Oklahoma
Populated places established in 1911